These are the Canadian number-one country albums of 1997 per RPM and SoundScan.

RPM

SoundScan

References

1997
1997 record charts
1997 in Canadian music